The fourteenth series of Geordie Shore, a British television programme based in Newcastle upon Tyne, was confirmed on 31 October 2016 when cast member Scotty T announced that he would be taking a break from the series to focus on other commitments. The series was filmed in November 2016, and began airing on 28 March 2017. Ahead of the series, it was also confirmed that original cast member Holly Hagan had quit the show, following her exit in the previous series. On 28 February 2017, it was announced that eight new cast members had joined for this series. Zahida Allen, Chelsea Barber, Sam Bentham, Sarah Goodhart, Abbie Holborn, Elettra Lamborghini, Billy Phillips and Eve Shannon all appeared throughout the series hoping to become permanent members of the cast, and in the series finale, Holborn was chosen. Goodhart and Allen both previously appeared on Ex on the Beach, with the former appearing on the third series of the show as the ex-girlfriend of current Geordie Shore cast member Marty McKenna (before he joined the cast). Lamborghini has also appeared on Super Shore and participated in the fifth season of Gran Hermano VIP, the Spanish version of Celebrity Big Brother. It was also confirmed that Scotty T would return later in the series.

Cast
 Zahida Allen
 Chelsea Barber
 Gaz Beadle
 Sam Bentham
 Aaron Chalmers
 Chloe Ferry
 Sarah Goodhart
 Nathan Henry
 Abbie Holborn
Sophie Kasaei
 Elettra Lamborghini
 Marty McKenna
 Billy Phillips
 Eve Shannon
 Marnie Simpson
 Scotty T

Duration of cast 

 = Cast member is featured in this episode.
 = Cast member arrives in the house.
 = Cast member voluntarily leaves the house.
 = Cast member is removed from the house.
 = Cast member returns to the house.
 = Cast member leaves the series.
 = Cast member returns to the series.
 = Cast member does not feature in this episode.
 = Cast member is not officially a cast member in this episode.

Episodes

Ratings

References

2017 British television seasons
Series 13